Cuttlebone, also known as cuttlefish bone, is a hard, brittle internal structure (an internal shell) found in all members of the family Sepiidae, commonly known as cuttlefish, within the cephalopods. In other cephalopod families it is called a gladius.

Cuttlebone is composed primarily of aragonite. It is a chambered, gas-filled shell used for buoyancy control; its siphuncle is highly modified and is on the ventral side of the shell. The microscopic structure of cuttlebone consists of narrow layers connected by numerous upright pillars.

Because of this limitation, most species of cuttlefish live on the seafloor in shallow water, usually on the continental shelf.

The largest cuttlebone belongs to the Australian giant cuttlefish, which lives between the surface and a maximum depth of 100 metres.

Human uses
In the past, cuttlebones were ground up to make polishing powder, which was used by goldsmiths. The powder was also added to toothpaste, and was used as an antacid for medicinal purposes or as an absorbent. They were also used as an artistic carving medium during the 19th and 20th centuries.

Today, cuttlebones are commonly used as calcium-rich dietary supplements for caged birds, chinchillas, hermit crabs, reptiles, shrimp, and snails. These are not intended for human consumption.

Lime production
As a carbonate-rich biogenic raw material, cuttlebone has potential to be used in the production of calcitic lime.

Jewelry making
Because cuttlebone is able to withstand high temperatures and is easily carved, it serves as mold-making material for small metal castings for the creation of jewelry and small sculptural objects.

It can also be used in the process of pewter casting, as a mould.

Internal structure
The microstructure of the cuttlebone consists of two components, horizontal septa and vertical pillars. Both components are composed predominantly of aragonite. The horizontal septa divide the cuttlebone into separate chambers. These chambers are supported by the vertical pillars which have a corrugated (or "wavy") structure. The thickness of these pillars varies from species to species, but are typically a few microns thick. The horizontal septa are typically thicker than the vertical pillars and consist of a double-layered structure. The upper layer of the septa and walls consist of vertically aligned crystals, whereas the bottom sublayer consists of nanorods rotated with respect to each other to form a "plywood" structure. Overall, this chambered microstructure results in the cuttlebone having a porosity over 90% by volume.

Mechanical properties

The cuttlebone has been studied extensively due to its ability to be simultaneously lightweight, stiff, and tolerant to damage. This combination of mechanical properties has led to research into cuttlebone-inspired biomimetic ceramic foams. In addition, due to its mechanical properties, cuttlebone has been used as scaffolding in superconductors and tissue engineering applications. The light weight of the cuttlebone derives from its high porosity (over 90% by volume). The stiffness of the cuttlebone arises from the chambered structure composition of approximately 95% aragonite (a stiff material) and 5% organic material. Since the stiffness of a composite will be dominated by the material with the largest volume fraction, the cuttlebone is also stiff. The specific stiffness of the cuttlebone in one species was measured to be as high as 8.4 [(MN)m/kg]. The most intriguing property of cuttlebone is its ability to tolerate damage given that aragonite is a brittle material. The high tolerance to damage can be linked to the cuttlebone's unique microstructure.

Deformation process
Due to the marine lifestyle of the cuttlefish, the cuttlebone must be capable of both withstanding large compressive forces from the water while avoiding sudden brittle failure. The cuttlebone of some species under compression has demonstrated a specific energy on par with some advanced foams made from more compliant materials such as metals and polymers. The high energy absorption is a result of several factors.

The failure of the cuttlebone occurs in three distinct stages: local crack formation, crack expansion, and densification. Crack formation typically occurs in the middle of the vertical walls in the chambered structure of the cuttlebone. The location of crack formation is controlled by the waviness in the corrugated structure of the walls. The waviness of the walls in the cuttlebone provides an optimized balance between stiffness and brittleness of the overall structure. This wavy structure inhibits crack propagation, increasing the energy input necessary for failure. After sufficient damage has occurred to the walls of the cuttlebone, a process known as densification occurs whereby the walls gradually compact while fracture continues. Significant energy is dissipated in the continued cracking of the walls while densification is occurring. It has also been observed that under compressive stresses, the horizontally layered chambers of the cuttlebone will fail sequentially. While one chamber is undergoing fracture and densification, the other chambers will not deform until the septum between the chambers has been penetrated. The septum is significantly stronger than the vertical walls due to its "plywood" structure further increasing the total energy needed for complete structural failure of the cuttlebone.

See also
 Argonaut (animal)
 Belemnoidea
 Gladius (cephalopod)
 Mollusc shell
 Nautilus

Explanatory footnotes

References

External links 
 

Articles containing video clips
Cephalopod zootomy
Cuttlefish
Mollusc products